The RLJ Companies is an American asset management firm owned by entrepreneur Robert Louis Johnson. After selling Black Entertainment Television in 2001, Johnson’s first company, he created RLJ Companies in Bethesda, Maryland. The company’s network includes hotel real estate investment, private equity, financial services, asset management, insurance services, car dealerships, sports and entertainment, and video lottery terminal (VLT) gaming. The company is headquartered in Bethesda and has additional offices in Charlotte, North Carolina; Little Rock, Arkansas; Los Angeles, California; San Juan, Puerto Rico, and Monrovia, Liberia.

History

Robert L. Johnson founded The RLJ Companies in 2002 in Bethesda, Maryland. Johnson serves as chairman of the company. Previous to founding The RLJ Companies, Johnson owned BET, which he sold to Viacom in 2001. He remained on at BET as its CEO through 2006.

In 2001, Johnson and Tom Baltimore started RLJ Lodging Trust with six hotels. RLJ Lodging Trust started as RLJ Development and changed its name when it went public on the New York Stock Exchange under RLJ on May 13, 2011. The company operates in 21 states with 149 hotels under global brands including Courtyard by Marriott, Hilton Garden Inn, Hyatt Place and Embassy Suites Hotels. In 2008, RLJ Companies formed a partnership with Global Building Solutions to build a 78-room luxury resort and spa in Monrovia, Liberia. The RLJ Kendeja Resort & Villas opened in March 2009. Thomas J. Baltimore Jr. served as president and CEO of RLJ Lodging Trust until his resignation on April 27, 2016, so that he could assume a similar role with Hilton's REIT. Ross H. Bierkan was appointed CEO on August 1, 2016.

David Rubenstein and Johnson partnered with Carlyle Group in 2006 to form RLJ Equity Partners, a middle-market equity firm. In September 2010, it partnered with Enhanced Recovery Corp to gain more presence in the Southeast. It has also invested in Fleischmann’s Vinegar, LAI International, TMone, Naylor and R. Thompson Trucking Inc.

In 2014, RLJ Equity Partners acquired Naylor Association Solutions, with its headquarters in Gainesville, Florida. 

Johnson collaborated with Mack McLarty and Steve Landers to create RLJ-McLarty-Landers Automotive Holdings, LLC in 2007. It is the parent company for Little Rock, Arkansas based RML Automotive. Johnson holds 60% of RLJ-McLarty-Landers Automotive Holdings, LLC, making it the largest minority-owned automotive dealership in the country.

In response to the 2010 Haiti earthquake, Global Building Solutions collaborated with RLJ Companies to form Caribbean Opportunity Holdings in April 2010.

Trading under NASDAQ as RLJAU, RLJ Acquisition was formed as a special-purpose acquisition company in December 2010 with the purpose of consummating business combinations. H. Van Sinclair serves as CEO.

RLJ Entertainment Inc. formed when the RLJ Companies acquired Acorn Media Group, Inc. and  Image Entertainment Inc. in 2012. It trades under the NASDAQ ticker RLJE.

References

2002 establishments in Maryland
American companies established in 2002
Financial services companies established in 2002
Investment management companies of the United States
Companies based in Bethesda, Maryland
Financial services companies based in Maryland